Slobozia-Rașcov (Sloboda-Rashkiv; , Sloboda-Rashkov) is a village in the Camenca District of Transnistria, Moldova. It has since 1990 been administered as a part of the breakaway Pridnestrovian Moldavian Republic (PMR).

Geography
The village of Slobozia-Rașcov is in Eastern Europe. It's located at

References

External links
Raszków miejsce magiczne, an article about the history of Polish settlement in Slobozia-Rașcov 

Villages of Transnistria
Olgopolsky Uyezd
Camenca District